Kerala poet and Indian poet

Vyloppilli Sreedhara Menon (11 May 1911 – 22 December 1985) (also written as Vailoppilli) was an Indian poet of Malayalam literature. Known for his works such as Kudiyozhikkal, Kannikkoythu and Mambazham, Menon was the founder president of the Purogamana Kala Sahitya Sangham, an organization of Kerala-based artists, writers and art and literature enthusiasts. He was a recipient of several honors including Sahitya Akademi Award, Kerala Sahitya Akademi Award for Poetry, Vayalar Award and Odakkuzhal Award.

Life and career 
Vyloppilli Sreedhara Menon was born on May 11, 1911 in Kaloor in ernakulam to Cheranellore Kochukuttan Kartha and Nanikutty Amma. Starting his early education was with a local Asan (teacher), Menon did his formal education initially at the Government Primary School, Kaloor and later at St. Albert's High School, Ernakulam from where he completed the high school education in 1927. Subsequently, he graduated in Science from Maharaja's College, Ernakulam. He continued his education to pass BT degree from Seythapet Training College, Madras and started his career as a teacher in government service in 1931 at Kandassamkadavu Government High School. His teaching career took him to 20 different schools in Kerala until his retirement from service in 1966 as the head master of Ollur High School, the present day Vailoppilli Sreedhara Menon Memorial Government Vocational Higher Secondary School. He was involved with literary organizations such as Kerala Sahitya Akademi and Sahitya Pravartaka Sahakarana Sanghom; he was a member of the organizing committee of the former and the board of directors of the latter. He also served as the editor of the official magazine of the Kerala Sasthra Sahithya Parishad. When Purogamana Kala Sahitya Sangham, a forum of progressive writers led by leftist intellectuals and artists, was formed in 1981, he was selected as its founder president and he held the position until 1985. He represented Kerala thrice at the national poets' meetings of 1951 (Delhi), 1959 (Delhi) and 1965 (Bengaluru) and toured the Soviet Union in 1970.

Menon married Bhanumathi Amma, a school teacher, in 1955. They had two sons, Sreekumar, an ayurvedic physician and Vijayakumar, a homeopathic doctor. However, the couple had differences between themselves and were staying separately when he died on December 22, 1985, succumbing to brain hemorrhage. Bhanumathi Amma survived him and died on June 26, 2018.

Legacy 

Menon started writing under the pen name Sree and his first poetry anthology, Kannikkoythu (The Maiden Harvest) was published in 1947; Kuttikrishna Marar opined that the poems signify a strong sprouting of Malayalam poetry that deviated from the romantic tradition prevalent during those times. He is considered by literary historians as one of the major voices in Malayalam poetry who marked the transition from the Romantic to the modern era. A scientific insight into the historical roots of social evolution and a deeper understanding of the psychological undercurrents of the human mind characterise his poetry. His mastery of the medium is evident in all his poems both lyrical and narrative.

Menon published around 20 books, composed of poems, plays and biographies. Many critics consider the long poem Kudiyozhikkal (Eviction of the tenant) as his magnum opus. M. Leelavathy wrote that the poem is a ruthless self-examination of a middle class land owner who realizes that the future belongs not to himself but to his poor tenant whom he despises at heart. The poem has been translated into English by P. K. N. Panicker and is included in the book, Selected Poems of Valoppilli Sreedhara Menon. Vida, Kannikkoythu, Makarakoythu and Kaipavallari are among his other major works, all of which have won awards. Kanneerpadam, a poem he wrote soon after his separation from his wife, is reported to be autobiographical. Sahyante Makan, a Malayalam film released in 1982, is based on a poem of the same name written by Menon. One of his poems titled, Madathakkili, was used as a song in the movie, Vajrram.

Awards and honors 
Vyloppilli Sreedhara Menon received the Soviet Land Nehru Award in 1964, the same year as the Kerala Sahitya Akademi awarded him their annual award for poetry for his anthology, Kaipavallari. He received the Odakkuzhal Award  in 1971 for Vida and the anthology was awarded the Kendra Sahithya Academy Award, the same year. His work, Makarakoythu, was selected for the Vayalar Award in 1981. He was also a recipient of the Madras State Government Award, Kalyani Krishna Menon Prize and M. P. Paul Prize. An annual literary award, Vyloppilli Poetry Award, has been instituted in his honour. The Department of Cultural Affairs of the Government of Kerala have built a multi-purpose cultural complex housing an open air auditorium,  art gallery and museum block in Nanthancode, Thiruvananthapuram and the complex has been named Vailoppilly Samskrithi Bhavan in honor of the poet. The museum block also holds the personal belongings of Menon. Another institution that holds Menon's name is Government Vocational Higher Secondary School, Ollur, the institution where he served as the head master at the time of his retirement which is known as Vailoppilli Sreedhara Menon Memorial Government Vocational Higher Secondary School.

Works

Poems 

 
 
 
 
 
 
 
 
 
 
 
 
 
 

Sreerekha
Onappatukar
Kuruvikal
Minnaminni
Pachakkuthira
Mukulamala
Krishnamrigangal
Mambazham
Yugaparivarthanam

Plays 
Risyasringanum Alexandarum (Play)

Short stories 
 Himavante Puthrikal

Autobiography

Books and articles on Vyloppilli

References

External links 
 
 
 

Malayalam poets
Malayali people
Writers from Kochi
Malayalam-language writers
1911 births
1985 deaths
Recipients of the Sahitya Akademi Award in Malayalam
Recipients of the Kerala Sahitya Akademi Award
People from Ernakulam district
20th-century Indian poets
Indian male poets
20th-century Indian male writers